This is a list of characters in Pretty Rhythm: Dear My Future.

Main characters

Prizmmy

Prizmmy is a Prism Star group consisting of Mia Ageha, Reina Miyama, Karin Shijimi, and Ayami Ōruri. They are the main characters in Pretty Rhythm: Dear My Future. These characters are based on the real life girl group Prizmmy. All of them first made cameo appearances in episode 50 of Aurora Dream.

Mia is a lively 14-year-old girl based on Mia Kusakabe. Determined to surpass Aira Harune, a Prism star, she tries her best and never gives up on reaching her goal, which she tries to fulfill by getting into Pretty Top. She has feelings for Prism Ace, but is unaware of his true identity. Her catchphrase is "Mia is number one!"

Reina is a sensible 14-year-old girl based on Reina Kubo. She often keeps Mia grounded and has feelings for Itsuki Harune, Aira's younger brother.

Karin is a 13-year-old girl based on Karin Takahashi. With a candid personality, she makes everyone around her cheer up. She enjoys dancing and has eight younger brothers. She causes a lot of trouble for others, but is still thoughtful. Her catchphrase is "Galactical!"

Ayami is a shy 12-year-old girl based on Ayami Sema. Although she is shy, she can be quite courageous. She enjoys fashion and often takes notes on her notepad. Her catchphrase is "Taking notes!"

Puretty

 is a Prism Star group from South Korea who are in Japan on a study-abroad program at Pretty Top. The group consists of Hye-in, So-min, Shi-yoon, Chae-kyung, and Jae-eun, who are the main characters in Pretty Rhythm: Dear My Future. The characters are based on the real-life girl group Puretty.

Hye-in is a 15-year-old girl based on Yoo Hye-in. She is Mia's childhood friend and has a lively, hard-working personality. She becomes interested in Symphonia Series and is willing to help Yunsu with his dream by sponsoring him. She enjoys exercising to increase her stamina. Despite not winning the festival herself, Hye-in wins MVP and the Symphonia Dress at the Symphonia Summer Festival.

So-min is a 14-year-old girl based on Jeon So-min. She has a stubborn sense of justice and has won numerous trophies. So-min is in love with Yun-su. As a child, she loved the ocean but became frightened after drifting too far into it; with Yunsu's advice, she is able to overcome this fear.

Shi-yoon is a 16-year-old girl based on Cho Shi-yoon. She acts as a big sister to her team and works at her own pace. Usually, she is very kind and docile, but extremely scary when angered.

Chae-kyung is a 16-year-old girl based on Yoon Chae-kyung. She is Yunsu's younger sister and, coming from a wealthy family, she has a problem with thinking she can solve everything with money. Most of Puretty's expenses are paid by Chae-kyung and her family. Chae-kyung's mother was an actress and she wanted to make her proud by becoming one. However, after winning the film audition and having to choose between being an actress and a Prism Star, Chae-kyung realized that being a Prism Star makes her happy. Her catchphrase is "Celebrity!"

The youngest girl in the study abroad team, Jae-eun is a 13-year-old girl based on Jeon Jae-eun. She has an airheaded, clumsy, sweet, and honest personality. She falls in love easily with boys she thinks are handsome.

Recurring characters

Love-Mix
Love-Mix is a Prism Star duo composed of Itsuki Harune and Yong-hwa, who debut in Dear My Future.

Itsuki is Aira's 14-year-old mature little brother. Despite teasing Aira, Itsuki helps keeps her secret about being in Prism Shows from their family. Itsuki is interested in Prism Shows, despite not watching many of them, and later debuts as a Prism Star in Dear My Future. Though oblivious to Reina's affections for him, he eventually returns her feelings at the end of Dear My Future. In the future, he became a sports doctor after graduating from college.

Yong-hwa is a Prism Star from the same office as Puretty and is a childhood friend of Chae-kung and Yunsu. He is popular with women and knowledgeable about people's romantic feelings, calling his intuition a "Heart Shuffle". In the future, he becomes a popular actor.

Dear Crown

Yunsu is the owner of Dear Crown, a fashion and Prism Stone store right next to Shō's in Pretty Rhythm: Dear My Future. He is not liked at all by Shō, not because he is his rival in business, but because he is his rival in love. Yunsu has great respect for Aira and considers her as his muse or goddess. The clothes he designs are different from Shō's, according to Aira, because they are not cute but rather sexy and chic. His sister is Chae Kyung and he receives the affections of So Min. In the future, remains a designer.

Mi-sil is the dance instructor of Puretty and president of their management, Dear Princess.

Pair Charms

Mia's Pair Charm, who is usually seen as Mia's head accessory during Prism Shows.

Reina's Pair Charm, who always acts serious and impatient.

Karin's Pair Charm, who is always sleepy.

Ayami's Pair Charm, who is always focused on food and eating.

Vivvy is the Pair Charm of the entire Puretty team, but is attached to Hye-in during Prism shows. Vivvy is very cheeky when she talks. She also has a tendency to scratch Penguin Teacher whenever he appears.

Minor characters

Myeong-ja is the mother of both fashion designer Yunsu and ChaeKyung. A former actress and Prism Star herself, she used to be lovers with Kintaro Asechi, Kyoko Asechi's father and Kei's first husband. However, she was unable to live up the designers' expectations in the Prism Show world, no matter how much she tried. During this time, Kintaro caught a glimpse of Kei and her Prism shows, and decided to focus on making her a Prism Star instead. Although not formally breaking up with her, Myeong Ja could not take his obsession with Kei and her skill any longer, and left him in tears. She still holds a Prism Stone he designed, though it is empty. She is married to an unnamed husband, and only appears in flashbacks in the Dear My Future until Yunsu and Shou went to her to ask about the secrets of the birth of the Symphonia series.

ChaeKyung's father

Yunsu and ChaeKyung's father is also the husband of the children's mother, MyeongJa. Not much is known about him, although he patched up his daughter's wound at her recital when she fell. He is the owner of many resorts and expensive establishments. This is why ChaeKyoung has the ability to buy all of the things she does, and possibly why she is so spoiled. MyeongJa had broken up with Kintaro, and she felt she could not love again and began to hate everything. However, she credits the father of her children for teaching her to love again.

References

Pretty Rhythm
Pretty Rhythm